The Shire of Cunderdin is a local government area in the Wheatbelt region of Western Australia, about  west of Merredin and about  east of Perth, the state capital.

History
On 14 December 1894, the Meckering Road District was created, changing its name to the Cunderdin Road District on 3 November 1944. On 1 July 1961, it became a Shire following the passage of the Local Government Act 1960, which reformed all remaining road districts into shires.

Wards
All wards in the shire were abolished before the 3 May 2003 election. Prior to this, it had 8 councillors representing two wards - West Ward (3 councillors) and Central Ward (5 councillors).

Towns and localities
The towns and localities of the Shire of X with population and size figures based on the most recent Australian census:

Cunderdin Museum 
The Shire owned Cunderdin Museum is situated in the former No 3 Steam Pumping Station in Forrest Street with its tall chimney visible for miles.  It has the largest local collection of memorabilia, information and photographs of the history of the Cunderdin-Meckering area, including one of the best displays of farm equipment, original steam driven water pumping machinery, railway carriages, and even includes a Tiger Moth.

The interactive Earthquake House, gives visitors a real appreciation of what the 1968 Meckering earthquake felt like.

The Museum is open 10am to 4pm daily (except Christmas Day and Good Friday).

The Museum is also the home of the Cunderdin Men's Shed.

Population

Heritage-listed places

As of 2023, 29 places are heritage-listed in the Shire of Cunderdin, of which five are on the State Register of Heritage Places.

References

External links
 

Cunderdin